John 'The Footballer' Hayes is an Irish Gaelic football player.  He is viewed as being instrumental in his club, Carbery Rangers, winning county championships at junior, intermediate and senior level, Munsters, and an All-Ireland Intermediate Club Football Championship in 2005. In the meantime, he established himself at left corner forward on the Cork senior football team winning an All Ireland Football Championship in 2010.

Honours 

Carbery Rangers

 Cork Senior Football Championship: (1) 2016
 Kelleher Shield (Senior Football League) (3) 2009, 2011, 2014
 Cork Intermediate Football Championship: (1) 2005
 Munster Intermediate Club Football Championship (2) 2004, 2005
 All-Ireland Intermediate Club Football Championship (1) 2005
 Cork Junior Football Championship: (1) 2003
 Munster Junior Club Football Championship (1) 2004

Cork

 Munster Senior Football Championship (4) 2006, 2008, 2009, 2012
 All-Ireland Senior Football Championship (1) 2010
 National Football League (1) 2010
 Munster Under-21 Football Championship (3) 2004, 2005, 2006

Career statistics

Club

References

Club Championship Intermediate Football - Munster Final Winning Teams (2003-2006) at Munster GAA

Year of birth missing (living people)
Living people
Cork inter-county Gaelic footballers
Carbery Rangers Gaelic footballers
Winners of one All-Ireland medal (Gaelic football)